Harry Ruilton Watson (August 31, 1921 – June 8, 2001) was an American child actor, a U.S. Coast Guard combat photographer in World War II, and a pioneer in television journalism.

Early life
Watson was a member of the Watson Family, famous in the early days of Hollywood as being a family of child actors. Brother to Coy Watson Jr., Delmar, Bobs, Garry, Billy, Vivian, Gloria and Louise. The family lived by Echo Park area of Los Angeles and Harry attended Belmont High School. His high school yearbook the Campanile talked about his photography: "His magnificent sport action shots are the embodiment of perfection. His coach? Big brother Coy, of course."

Career
Watson performed supporting roles in many early Hollywood movies including, Mr. Smith Goes to Washington, Penrod and Sam, A Damsel in Distress as little "Albert", as well as many others.

During WWII, his career in Hollywood was interrupted, and he served on a tour of the Pacific Theater as a combat photographer.

After the war, he became a pioneer in television journalism, contributing to bringing same-day coverage to the KTTV evening news.

The Watson family were honored by the Hollywood Chamber of Commerce by placing the Watson family star on the Hollywood Walk of Fame, at 6674 Hollywood Blvd., Hollywood, California.

Partial filmography

Taxi 13 (1928) - Mactavish Child (uncredited)
Blue Skies (1929)
Love, Live and Laugh (1929) - Little Boy (uncredited)
Indiscreet (1931) - Baseball Captain (uncredited)
Too Many Cooks (1931) - Cousin Harry Cook (uncredited)
The Star Witness (1931) - Boy Baseball Player (uncredited)
The Sport Parade (1932) - Kendricks' Boy (uncredited)
Man's Castle (1933) - Baseball Team Captain (uncredited)
Call It Luck (1934) - Child (uncredited)
Life Begins at 40 (1935) - Meriwether Son (uncredited)
Silk Hat Kid (1935) - Child (uncredited)
Magnificent Obsession (1935) - Boy (uncredited)
Paddy O'Day (1936) - Street Boy (uncredited)
Under Proof (1936) - (uncredited)
Let's Sing Again (1936) - Orphan washing dishes (uncredited)
Show Boat (1936) - Boy (uncredited)
Bullets or Ballots (1936) - Kid Playing Pinball (uncredited)
Old Hutch (1936) - Freddie Hutchins
King of Hockey (1936) - Boy Locating Dugan (uncredited)
Time Out for Romance (1937) - Messenger (uncredited)
Love Is News (1937) - Newsboy (uncredited)
Penrod and Sam (1937) - Sam
The Road Back (1937) - Boy (uncredited)
Hot Water (1937) - Newsboy (uncredited)
A Damsel in Distress (1937) - Albert
Kidnapped (1938) - Sandy - an Urchin (uncredited)
The Adventures of Huckleberry Finn (1939) - Ben Donaldson (uncredited)
Mr. Smith Goes to Washington (1939) - Hopper Boy #3
I Take This Woman (1940) - Oldest Murphy Kid (scenes deleted) (final film role)

See also
Watson family

References

Bibliography
 John Holmstrom, The Moving Picture Boy: An International Encyclopaedia from 1895 to 1995, Norwich, Michael Russell, 1996, p. 105-106.

External links
 

1921 births
2001 deaths
20th-century American male actors
American male child actors
American male film actors
Belmont High School (Los Angeles) alumni
Male actors from Los Angeles
United States Coast Guard personnel of World War II
Harry